Alhassan Abdallah Iddi (born 22 February 1976) is a Ghanaian politician who is a member of the New Patriotic Party. He is the member of parliament for the Salaga North Constituency.

Early life and education 
Alhassan Abdallah Iddi hails from Kpalbusi. He holds a Master in Organization Development (Od Consultancy)

References 

Living people
1976 births
New Patriotic Party politicians